, also referred to as The Legend of Black Heaven and Kacho-Ōji, is a Japanese anime television series conceptualized by Hiroki Hayashi and produced by Pioneer Corporation, Pioneer LDC Inc., AIC and A.P.P.P. It is directed by Yasuhito Kikuchi, with Naruhisa Arakawa handling series composition, Kazuto Nakazawa designing the characters and Kōichi Korenaga composing the music. The series is about the middle-aged members of a short-lived heavy metal band and their unexpected role in an alien interstellar war.

The Japanese title of the anime is a multi-layered pun; it can be translated as "Section Manager Ouji" or literally "Section Manager Prince."

Plot summary
Middle-aged Ouji Tanaka has a wife, a child and a mundane job as a salary man in Tokyo's modern society. But his life wasn't always so dull; 15 years ago he was known as "Gabriel", lead guitar of a short-lived heavy metal band called "Black Heaven". Ouji's life takes a sudden turn when he is invited by an enigmatic woman to pick up his Gibson Flying V and once again display his legendary guitar skills. Little does he know the effects this will have on his family, on the other remaining members of Black Heaven, on an alien interstellar war with a mysterious ultimate weapon, or on the fate of the planet Earth.

Characters

 Formerly Gabriel, the lead guitarist of Black Heaven, Tanaka takes an office job following the break-up of the band to support his growing family. Years later, he's facing mid-life, wondering what went wrong, when Layla Yuki approaches him, asking him to play for her.

A major in the Alien Army, she is tasked with tracking down Ouji and getting him on their side to play music in order to activate the ultimate weapon. After finding him, she basically plays the role of an agent, acting as the go between the band and Colonel Fomalhaut, the space army commander.

A former groupie of Black Heaven, she marries Ouji when he finds out she is pregnant. She plays the role of the housewife and mother, watching in dismay as Ouji reverts to his rocker persona and suspicious that he may be having an affair with Layla. She is called "Yokko" by Ouji.

 Ouji and Yoshiko's son, who has a fascination with an outer space television show that he watches daily. He also believes that Layla is a character from the show.

 Layla's bumbling subordinates, who work in the same building as Ouji and Layla and help with her assignments. They are identified with their respective hair colors of blue, purple, and green. They are gullible to various rumors and often misinterpret human words and concepts.

 Formerly Michael of Black Heaven, he plays guitar and is the lead vocalist.

 Formerly Luke of Black Heaven, he plays drums. After the break-up of the band, he went into the real-estate business.

 Formerly Raphael of Black Heaven, he plays bass. After the break-up of the band, he opened up a grocery store.

 Formerly Joseph of Black Heaven, he played keyboard. After the break-up of the band, he went to New York to try to make it in the music business, only to meet an unfortunate end through an aggravated lobster and an insulted gangster. His remains are recovered by "the enemy" and used to create a clone/android to combat the reunited Black Heaven.

Episodes
Note: the links are to the article of the song probably referenced.

Themes

Opening
"Cautionary Warning" by John Sykes

Ending
Episodes 1-12: "Yappari Onna no Hoga Iiya (I Like To Be A Woman After All)" by Riyu Konaka
Episode 13: "Let Me Go, Let You Go" by Koichi Korenaga

Production
The opening theme "Cautionary Warning" was written and performed by English rock guitarist John Sykes, who played with rock bands including Thin Lizzy and Whitesnake.

Media
In the US, the series has been available on DVD from Geneon in four separate volumes since 2001, and in a 4-disc box set since 2005. It was released on Blu-ray from Discotek Media on January 26, 2021.

References

External links
 
 Official Japanese Website (NBCUniversal)
 Official Japanese Website

1999 anime television series debuts
Anime International Company
Anime with original screenplays
Discotek Media
Geneon USA
Music in anime and manga
NBCUniversal Entertainment Japan